The 667th Aircraft Control and Warning Squadron is an inactive United States Air Force unit. It was last assigned to the Air Forces Iceland, stationed at Hofn Air Station, Iceland. It was inactivated on 30 September 1988.

From 1951-1988, the unit was a General Surveillance Radar squadron providing for the air defense of Iceland and the North Atlantic.

Lineage
 Established as 667th Aircraft Control and Warning Squadron
 Activated on 8 December 1949
 Inactivated on 6 February 1952
 Reactivated on 1 July 1952
 Inactivated on 30 September 1988

Assignments
 542d Aircraft Control and Warning Group, 8 December 1949 - 6 February 1952
 65th Air Division (Defense), 1 July 1952
 Iceland Air Defense Force, 8 Mar 1954
 1400th Operations Group, 18 Dec 1955
 Air Forces Iceland, 1 July 1960 - 30 September 1988

Stations
 Hamilton AFB, California, 1 January 1951 - 6 February 1952
 Langanes Air Station, Iceland, 1 July 1952
 Hofn Air Station, Iceland, 1 July 1960 - 30 September 1988

References

  Cornett, Lloyd H. and Johnson, Mildred W., A Handbook of Aerospace Defense Organization  1946 - 1980,  Office of History, Aerospace Defense Center, Peterson AFB, CO (1980).

Radar squadrons of the United States Air Force